Yachiyo may refer to:
Yachiyo, Chiba, a city in Chiba Prefecture, Japan
Yachiyo, Hyōgo, a former town in Hyōgo Prefecture, Japan
Yachiyo, Ibaraki, a town in Ibaraki Prefecture, Japan
A fictional teenage Japanese-Hawaiian girl, the title character in Philip Kan Gotanda's play The Ballad of Yachiyo